"Armada Latina'" is the fourth single from Cypress Hill's studio album, Rise Up. It features Cuban rapper Pitbull and Puerto Rican singer Marc Anthony. It was released on March 2, 2010. The song samples the fourth portion of the 1969 Crosby, Stills, & Nash song "Suite: Judy Blue Eyes."

Music video
The music video, directed by Matt Alonzo, was filmed at Mariachi Plaza in Los Angeles. The video was premiered on April 8, 2010. Latin pop singer Belinda Peregrín and Kevin McCall are featured in the video. Anthony does not appear in the video, instead, a body double is used for his verses. Stephen Stills, writer of "Suite: Judy Blue Eyes", appears during the guitar breakdown.

Track listing
iTunes digital single

Charts

References

External links
"Armada Latina" music video

2010 singles
2010 songs
Cypress Hill songs
Pitbull (rapper) songs
Marc Anthony songs
Songs written by Marc Anthony
Songs written by Pitbull (rapper)
Songs written by Stephen Stills
Song recordings produced by Jim Jonsin
Songs written by Jim Jonsin
Songs written by B-Real
Songs written by Sen Dog
Priority Records singles